The 2006 WNBA season was the tenth and final season for the Charlotte Sting.

Offseason

Jia Perkins was picked up by the Chicago Sky in the WNBA Expansion Draft.

WNBA Draft

Regular season

Season standings

Season schedule

Player stats

References

Charlotte Sting seasons
Charlotte
Charlotte Sting